The Eastern Asiatic Region (also known as Oriasiaticum, Sino-Japanese Region, East Asian Region, Temperate Eastern Region) is the richest floristic region within the Holarctic Kingdom and situated in temperate East Asia. It has been recognized as a natural floristic area since 1872 August Grisebach's volume Die Vegetation der Erde and later delineated by such geobotanists as Ludwig Diels, Adolf Engler (as Temperate Eastern region), Ronald Good (as Sino-Japanese Region) and Armen Takhtajan.

The Eastern Asiatic Region is dominated by very old lineages of gymnosperms and woody plant families and is thought to be the cradle of the Holarctic flora. Moreover, this floristic region wasn't significantly glaciated in the Pleistocene, and many relict Tertiary genera (such as Metasequoia glyptostroboides, ancestors of which were once common throughout the Northern Hemisphere up to subpolar latitudes) found refuge here.

Endemic flora
The Eastern Asiatic Region endemic flora is characterized by:

Endemic families
about 30 endemic families, including: Ginkgoaceae, Sciadopityaceae, Trochodendraceae, Tetracentraceae, Cercidiphyllaceae, Circaeasteraceae, Eucommiaceae, Eupteleaceae, Sargentodoxaceae, Nandinaceae, Pteridophyllaceae, Rhoipteleaceae, Stachyuraceae, Sladeniaceae, Dipentodontaceae, Helwingiaceae.

Endemic genera
three to six hundred endemic genera, including: Cephalotaxus, Amentotaxus, Pseudotaxus, Keteleeria, Pseudolarix, Cathaya, Metasequoia, Cryptomeria, Microbiota, Akebia, Kingdonia, Megaleranthis, Hylomecon, Eomecon, Маcleaya, Disanthus, Loropetalum, Corylopsis, Fortunearia, Sinowilsonia, Pteroceltis, Idesia, Bolbostemma, Schizopeppon, Clematoclethra, Bryanthus, Schizocodon, Stephanandra, Rhodotypos, Kerria, Chaenomeles, Rhaphiolepis, Prinsepia, Dichotomanthes, Kirengeshoma, Tanakaea, Maakia, Phellodendron, Poncirus, Psilopeganum, Таpiscia, Dipteronia, Fatsia, Tetrapanax, Diplopanax, Evodiopanax, Kalopanax, Hovenia, Dipelta, Kolkwitzia, Oreocharis, Paulownia, Ombrocharis, Paralamium, Perillula, Popoviocodonia, Platycodon, Hanabusaya, Callistephus, Parasenecio, Symphyllocarpus, Chionographis, Metanarthecium, Heloniopsis, Tricyrtis, Cardiocrinum, Hosta, Reineckea, Nomocharis, Milula, Rohdea, Liriope, Aspidistra, Lycoris, Sasa, Phyllostachys, Oreocalamus, Shibataea, Phaenosperma, Chikusichloa, Trachycarpus, and Pinellia.

Approximately eight other families are shared with tropical Southeast Asia (Nageiaceae, Rhodoleiaceae, Daphniphyllaceae, Pentaphyllaceae, Duabangaceae, Mastixiaceae, Pentaphragmataceae, Lowiaceae). As has long been noted, many relict genera occurring in East Asia, such as Liriodendron and Hamamelis, are shared with temperate North America, especially the North American Atlantic Region.

Adjacent Regions
The Eastern Asiatic Region is bordered by the Circumboreal Region of the Holarctic Kingdom in the north, the Irano-Turanian Region of the same kingdom in the west and Indian, Indochinese and Malesian Regions of the Paleotropical Kingdom in the south. It comprises the southern part of the Russian Far East, southern part of Sakhalin, Manchuria, Korea, Japan, Taiwan, relatively humid eastern part of the mainland China from Manchuria and the seashore to Eastern Himalaya and Kali Gandaki Valley in Nepal, including Sikkim, northern Burma and northernmost Vietnam (parts of Tonkin).

Subdivisions
According to a version of Takhtajan's classification, the Eastern Asiatic Region is further subdivided into 13 provinces; however, the number and delimitation of the southern provinces is disputed and varies even across Takhtajan's work.
Manchurian Province
two endemic genera (Microbiota, Omphalothrix), many endemic species (including Abies holophylla, Picea koraiensis, Ulmus macrocarpa, Crataegus pinnatifida, Vitis amurensis)
Sakhalin-Hokkaido Province
one endemic genus (Miyakea), some endemic species (including Abies sachalinensis, Fragaria yezoensis)
Japan-Korean Province
Ryukyu Province
Volcanic-Bonin Province
Taiwanese Province
Northern Chinese Province
Central Chinese Province
Southeastern Chinese Province
Sikang-Yuennan Province
Northern Burmese Province
Eastern Himalayan Province
Khasi-Manipur Province

References

Cheng-yih Wu. Delineation and Unique Features of the Sino-Japanese Floristic Region. David E. Boufford and Hideaki Ohba (eds.), University of Tokyo Bulletin 37: Sino-Japanese Flora — Its Characteristics and Diversification. Tokyo: University of Tokyo, 1998.

Floristic regions
Natural history of Asia